Aykut Akgün (born 18 September 1987) is a Turkish professional footballer who plays as an attacking midfielder for an amateur side Nilüfer Belediye FK.

References

External links
 
 

1987 births
Footballers from Karlsruhe
German people of Turkish descent
Living people
German footballers
Turkish footballers
Turkey B international footballers
Turkey youth international footballers
Association football midfielders
Trabzonspor footballers
Maltepespor footballers
Zeytinburnuspor footballers
Karlsruher SC II players
Giresunspor footballers
Karşıyaka S.K. footballers
Çaykur Rizespor footballers
Kardemir Karabükspor footballers
Adana Demirspor footballers
Eskişehirspor footballers
Şanlıurfaspor footballers
Bursaspor footballers
Süper Lig players
Regionalliga players
TFF First League players
TFF Second League players